The 7th Annual Nickelodeon Argentina Kids' Choice Awards was held on 19 October 2017, at Teatro Coliseo in Buenos Aires, and was broadcast on 21 October 2017 through Nickelodeon. Mercedes Lambre and Leandro Leunis hosted the ceremony. Lali and Isabella Castillo led nominations with three each, and also were the biggest winners of the night, along with Camila Cabello and Mica Viciconte, with two awards each. Susana Giménez received the Career Achievement Award.

Hosts
Mercedes Lambre and Leandro Leunis
Stéfano de Gregorio

Performances

Presenters
Valentina Zenere and Denise Dumas — presented Favourite Male YouTuber
Rocío Igarzábal — introduced Piso 21
Eleonora Wexler and Sebastián Estevanez — presented Favourite Actor and Favourite Actress
Nacho Nayar and Ramiro Nayar — presented Favourite Digital Newcomer
Heidi, bienvenida a casa cast — introduced Kally's MashUp cast
Belu Lucius and Kevsho — presented Favourite Villain
Leo Deluglio — presented Favourite Web Series and Favourite Couple
Victorio D'Alessandro and Vicky Ramos — introduced Oriana Sabatini
Marley — presented Career Achievement Award
Guada and Juani — introduced MYA
Austín Bernasconi — presented Trendy Boy award
Agustina Casanova and Diego Poggi — presented Favourite TV Show
Michael Ronda and Jórge Lopez — presented Favourite Radio Show
Andy Kusnetzoff — presented Pro-Social Award
Franco Masini and Delfina Chaves — presented Trendy Girl award
Airbag — presented Favourite Female YouTuber

Winners and nominees
Nominees were announced on September 21, 2017.
Winners are listed first, in bold. Other nominees are in alphabetical order.

Music
Source:

TV and movies
Source:

Digital
Source:

Miscellaneous
Source:

References

External links
 

Nickelodeon Kids' Choice Awards
Nick
Nick